Gorran Haven is a fishing village, in the civil parish of St Goran, on the south coast of Cornwall, England, UK.

Overview

The village lies in a cove between two sandy beaches. Vault Beach (also known as Bow beach) is south of Gorran Haven and Great Perhaver Beach is to the north, both beaches are naturist beaches.

Gorran Haven was an ancient fishing harbour; its first pier was built in the 15th century. In the 18th and 19th centuries it became a port handling merchandise brought from Fowey by barges and lighters. The pier was rebuilt in the 1820s and reconstructed in 1888. There are two churches in the village, Haven Church (previously Mount Zion), and St Just Church. St Just Church had been used as a fish cellar for over a century. In 1812 the Congregationalists of Mevagissey moved into the Haven using St Just as their Meeting House and referring to it as the old Chapel Cellar. Haven Church is a non-denominational church.

The Cinema Museum in London holds home movies of the village in the 1950's.

Notable residents
 Sir Richard Dearlove (1945– ), civil servant, was born in and spent his early childhood in the village.
 Charles William Peach (1800–1886), naturalist and geologist, lived in the village and worked in the surrounding landscape, there is a plaque to his memory in the village. 
 Ben Peach (1842–1926), son of Charles, geologist, was born in the village.
 Colin Wilson (1931–2013), author, lived in the village for over 50 years.

See also

 Gorran Churchtown
 Gorran Highlanes
 St Goran
 The Gwineas

References

External links
Village website

Villages in Cornwall
Populated coastal places in Cornwall
Nude beaches